This is a list of North Dakota Superintendents of Public Instruction. The office was on a party-affiliated ballot until the year 1913, since then it has been on the no party ballot, although most Superintendents have had some association with one party or another. The Superintendent served a two-year term office until 1964. Since then, they have been elected to four-year terms.

See also
North Dakota Superintendent of Public Instruction

External links
North Dakota Department of Public Instruction website

Public Instruction